Pamir Airways Flight 112 was a scheduled passenger flight from Kunduz Airport, Kunduz to Kabul International Airport in Kabul, Afghanistan. On 17 May 2010, the flight was operated by an Antonov An-24 carrying 39 passengers and 5 crew when it crashed onto terrain. No one onboard made it out alive.

Flight history
The aircraft involved was an Antonov An-24, manufacturer's serial number (MSN) 27307903, registration YA-PIS. The aircraft first flew in 1972 and had been bought by Pamir Airways in February 2010, having spent some time in storage in Bulgaria.

Flight
Flight 112 departed Kunduz at 8:30 am local time (UTC+4:30) and all contact with the flight was lost 10 minutes later. The flight had 39 passengers and 5 crew on board when it disappeared from radar.
The weather conditions were reported as poor, with a senior military commander describing the weather as "...very bad. It is snowing. There is flooding."

An inquest in the United Kingdom stated that the accident report determined that the cause of the accident was the failure of the captain to maintain adequate clearance from terrain. The crew contacted air traffic control to ask for permission to descend, and the air traffic controller asked the crew to maintain their current altitude, but the plane began its descent in bad weather into a mountainous area. ATC did not warn the crew they were descending too quickly and into danger. Additionally, the crew misunderstood a ground proximity warning system alert, either due to language problems or because of previous false alerts.

Rescue attempts

It was reported that the Afghanistan government had requested assistance from NATO. The organisation sent search planes to the last known position of the aircraft, but they were forced to turn back four miles from the believed crash site due to bad weather. The colonel in charge of the southern stretch of the pass said that "the only way they can search is on foot. The helicopters can't get in." The search for the aircraft resumed on the morning of 18 May, and the "crash area"  was located later that day, according to Yalda Natiq, the transport ministry's head of communications.

Initial reports that the wreckage of the aircraft had been located late on Tuesday evening (18 May) proved to be false, and the search continued late on Wednesday 19 May. Afghan police, local people and International Security Assistance Force (ISAF) helicopters were involved in the search. The rugged, mountainous terrain, fog and snow again hampered the search. On 20 May, it was announced that the tail section of the aircraft had been spotted.

On 21 May, the wreckage was reached by rescuers. "Parts of the crashed plane are lying in front of me. "It is too soon to say that no one has survived. But so far we cannot see anyone alive and the situation here is extreme – cold, snow, wind" he said.

Passengers and crew
There were a number of Afghan nationals aboard the aircraft. The BBC reported that six foreigners, including three Britons, were also on board. One American passenger was reported by a State Department source. On 21 May, chief aviation investigator Ghulam Farooq reported an unknown number of nationals from Australia, Pakistan and Tajikistan were also among the eight foreign passengers aboard the plane. It was reported that up to three Australians may have been on board. As of 22 May, the report remains unconfirmed.

See also

 Kam Air Flight 904 where the aircraft struck the peak of the Chaperi Mountain, 20 miles east of Kabul International Airport.

References

External links
 "Latest News About PM1102(AN-24B)." Pamir Airways

2010 in Afghanistan
Accidents and incidents involving the Antonov An-24
Aviation accidents and incidents in 2010
Aviation accidents and incidents in Afghanistan
May 2010 events in Afghanistan